Dombey and Son is a 1917 British silent drama film directed by Maurice Elvey and starring Norman McKinnel, Lilian Braithwaite and Hayford Hobbs. It is an adaptation of the 1848 novel Dombey and Son by Charles Dickens. It is unknown if any copy of the film exists.

Plot 
The dream of Paul Dombey, the wealthy owner of the shipping company, is to have a son to continue his business. Tragically, Dombey's wife dies shortly after giving birth to their son.

Cast
 Norman McKinnel — Paul Dombey
 Lilian Braithwaite — Edith Dombey
 Hayford Hobbs — Walter Dombey
 Mary Odette — Florence Dombey
 Douglas Munro — Solomon Gillis
 Jerrold Robertshaw — Carker
 Fewlass Llewellyn — Bagstock
 Will Corrie — Captain Scuttle
 Evelyn Walsh Hall — Mrs. Skenton

References

External links
 

1919 films
British silent feature films
1910s English-language films
Films directed by Maurice Elvey
1910s historical drama films
Films based on British novels
Ideal Film Company films
Films based on works by Charles Dickens
Films set in England
British historical drama films
British black-and-white films
1917 drama films
1917 films
1919 drama films
1910s British films
Silent drama films